There have been two US Navy ships called Trieste:

 (DSV-0) Bathyscaphe Trieste
 (DSV-1) Bathyscaphe Trieste II

There was also reference to a starship USS Trieste on Star Trek: The Next Generation.

United States Navy ship names